Decision in Paradise is an album by Frank Lowe recorded in 1984 and released on the Soul Note label.

Reception
The Allmusic review states, "Although a touch more conservative than one might expect (more of an open-minded straightahead set than music emphasizing sound explorations), all six group originals are of interest".

Track listing
All compositions by Frank Lowe except as indicated
 "Decision in Paradise - 5:05   
 "I'll Whistle Your Name" (Butch Morris) - 3:27   
 "Cherryco" (Don Cherry) - 6:03   
 "Lowe-Ologie" - 5:28   
 "You Dig!" (Grachan Moncur III) - 8:23   
 "Dues and Don'ts" - 10:57

Personnel
Frank Lowe - tenor saxophone
Don Cherry - trumpet  
Grachan Moncur III - trombone
Geri Allen - piano
Charnett Moffett - bass
Charles Moffett - drums

References

Frank Lowe albums
1985 albums
Black Saint/Soul Note albums